UQ Lakes busway station is located in Brisbane, Australia, serving the University of Queensland's St Lucia campus. It opened on 17 December 2006 at the western terminus of the Eastern Busway at the end of the Eleanor Schonell Bridge.

By 2012, about 1.5 million passengers were using the bus stop each year, making it one of the top-5 busiest stops in Brisbane.

Originally opening with one platform, a second platform using the existing pathway was added 2008 in order to serve a route extension from West End. 

A further expansion costing $3 million began construction in 2011 to cope with increased bus services. Opening in June 2012, the upgrade involved a turning lane upgrade, an increase from four to six stops, larger waiting areas, additional shelters and improved lighting.

In May 2015 the University of Queensland ferry wharf was relocated to a location near the UQ Lakes busway station.

It is served by six routes all operated by Brisbane Transport.

References

External links

[ UQ Lakes station] TransLink

Bus stations in Brisbane
St Lucia, Queensland
University of Queensland
Transport infrastructure completed in 2006